Presumption of Innocence is a 1988 Soviet comedy film directed by .

Plot 
The film tells about the famous singer who loses a jacket with a passport on the train. Two stowaways appear to be police officers and try to help her.

Cast 
 Lyubov Polishchuk as Zoya Bolotnikova
 Stanislav Sadalskiy as Leonid Borisovich Ozeran
 Vasiliy Funtikov as Misha Sovchi
 Leonid Kuravlyov as Bondarev
 Yuriy Bogatyryov as Kozinets
 Nikolai Pastukhov as Pyotr Nikitich
 Irina Rakshina as Lidiya Semyonovna
 Oleg Garkusha as Slava
 Elena Kovaleva as Maid
 Lyubov Malinovskaya as Nedyalkova

References

External links 
 

1988 films
1980s Russian-language films
Soviet comedy films
1988 comedy films